The Henry I. Paddock House is a historic house at 346 Sheridan Road in Winthrop Harbor, Illinois. Built in 1860 by Henry I. Paddock, the house is the oldest in Winthrop Harbor. The house was designed in the Italianate style, a popular choice in the 1850s and 1860s. Its design includes a front-facing gable and tall, thin windows topped with arches, both typical Italianate elements; it originally included two Italianate porches as well. The house was remodeled in 1884 to add Queen Anne elements, including a bay window with wood detailing and stained glass transoms above the doors.

The house was added to the National Register of Historic Places on May 30, 2001.

References

National Register of Historic Places in Lake County, Illinois
Houses on the National Register of Historic Places in Illinois
Italianate architecture in Illinois
Queen Anne architecture in Illinois
Houses completed in 1860